Mih Lachache (also written Mouiat el Achech) is a village in the commune of Mih Ouensa, in Mih Ouensa District, El Oued Province, Algeria.

References

Neighbouring towns and cities

Populated places in El Oued Province